Broken Arrow is a 1996 American action-thriller film directed by John Woo, written by Graham Yost, and starring John Travolta, Christian Slater, and Samantha Mathis. The film's main themes include the theft of two American nuclear weapons, the attempts of U.S. military authorities to recover them, and the feud between Travolta and Slater's characters. The film was a commercial success despite mixed reviews.

Plot
Major Vic "Deak" Deakins and Captain Riley Hale, pilots in the United States Air Force (USAF), are assigned to a secret exercise flying a stealth bomber with two B83 nuclear bombs. After successfully evading Air Force radar, Deakins suddenly attacks Hale and ejects him from the plane. Deakins releases the bombs without activating them, then reports that Hale has gone rogue. He ejects from the plane, leaving it to crash in a national park in Utah.

A USAF team led by Chief Master Sergeant Rhodes is sent to find the missing warheads, declared as a "Broken Arrow" situation. The search team eventually locates the warheads in a canyon, but is ambushed by mercenaries. Rhodes tries to disable the warheads but is killed by the other search team survivor, Master Sergeant Kelly, who is serving as a mole for Deakins. Deakins arrives and plots his next move with Pritchett, the mercenaries' financier. They plan to blackmail the US government with the threat of detonating the warhead in a populated area.

Hale, who survived the ejection, is arrested by park ranger Terry Carmichael, who had been investigating the unusual events in the park. He instead convinces her to help him track down Deakins. Deakins' mercenaries commandeer a USAF search and rescue helicopter to kill Hale, but Hale and Terry manage to bring it down. The loss of the helicopter forces Deakins' men to continue in Humvees.

Hale and Terry carjack the Humvee with the warheads, escaping to a nearby abandoned copper mine, where Hale starts to disable one, only for Deakins to reveal via radio that he has programmed it so that Hale’s attempts to disarm it will cause the bomb to activate. Hale and Terry take the armed warhead down the shaft, where the mine is deep enough to contain the nuclear blast. Before they can bring down the second warhead, Deakins' team arrives and secures it. After a gun battle deep in the mines, Deakins shortens the countdown of the armed warhead while leaving Hale and Terry trapped.

They escape via an underground river just before the bomb detonates. The bomb's nuclear electromagnetic pulse disables an approaching NEST helicopter, allowing Deakins to escape. Deakins then kills Pritchett, having grown tired of his complaints and for straying from the mission plan. Terry and Hale track the mercenaries to a motorboat used for transporting the warhead down the river. While trying to steal the boat, Terry is forced to hide onboard, while military forces rescue Hale.

Hale deduces that Deakins intends to use a train to transport the warhead. Colonel Max Wilkins decides to disobey orders to help Hale. Stowing on the train, Terry tries to sabotage the warhead but is caught by Deakins, who arms the bomb. Catching up on a USAF helicopter, Hale saves Terry before Deakins can throw her off the train. A gunfight ensues, killing Wilkins and causing the helicopter to crash, and most of the mercenaries die in the aftermath.

Deakins has prepared a remote control that can either disarm or detonate the warhead and gets ready to depart the train on his own getaway helicopter. Hale's sabotage of the helicopter's fuel pump causes it to explode, leaving Deakins and Kelly stranded with the ticking bomb. With his plan falling apart, Deakins decides to shorten the countdown timer out of spite. Not wanting to die, Kelly holds Deakins at gunpoint and orders him to disarm the weapon. Hale sneaks up on them during their bickering and kicks Kelly out of the boxcar to his death, then engages in a gun battle with Deakins.

Terry detaches the section of the train containing the bomb but gets into a shootout with the engineer. The latter is shot and falls on the train brakes, allowing the detached boxcars to catch up, at increasingly higher speed. Deakins still has the remote detonator, so he forces Hale to drop his gun and challenges him to a fight. Hale eventually overpowers Deakins, acquires the remote detonator, disarms the warhead and leaps out of the train. As the detached boxcars slam into the halted front half and shunt the warhead at speed, Deakins gets up, determined to take on the warhead hurtling towards him. However, the warhead flies through him into a stack of oil barrels, causing the train to derail and the barrels and Deakins to explode. 

Hale finds Terry and the dormant warhead. The two formally introduce themselves amidst the wreckage.

Cast

 John Travolta as United States Air Force Major Vic "Deak" Deakins
 Christian Slater as United States Air Force Captain Riley Hale
 Samantha Mathis as United States Park Service Park Ranger Terry Carmichael
 Delroy Lindo as United States Air Force Colonel Max Wilkins
 Frank Whaley as Giles Prentice
 Bob Gunton as Mr. Pritchett
 Howie Long as United States Air Force Pararescueman Master Sergeant Kelly
 Jack Thompson as Chairman of the Joint Chiefs of Staff
 Kurtwood Smith as Secretary of Defense Baird
 Vondie Curtis-Hall as United States Air Force Pararescueman Lieutenant Colonel Sam Rhodes
 Daniel von Bargen as United States Air Force General Creely
 Jeffrey Stephan as Shepherd

Music
The original music score was composed by Hans Zimmer. An expanded double-disc limited set of the music score was released by La-La Land Records in February 2011. Also credited for additional music are Zimmer-regulars Harry Gregson-Williams and John Powell.

The score is considered to be one of Zimmer's best action scores by fans and film critics. The opening track "Rope-A-Dope", also known as "Deakin's Theme" has been widely used in other films and media, including Scream 2 and Speed 2. The famous riff from "Rope-A-Dope" was played by legendary guitarist Duane Eddy, who Zimmer brought in for the entire Broken Arrow scoring session.

Production
Principal photography began on April 26, 1995. Some filming took place in and around the mountain areas of Glen Canyon National Recreation Area in Kane County, Utah. The lake scene with Hale and Carmichael was filmed at Lake Powell. The desert sequences were shot in the Mojave Desert near Barstow, California, and in Coconino County near Page, Arizona. The final climax scenes with Deakins and his men on the train, including the action sequence with Deakins and Hale fighting in the train car, were filmed on the privately owned Central Montana Rail, Inc. (CM) in Fergus County between Lewistown, Montana, and Denton, Montana.

In July 1995, a number of elaborate train cars were sent to the location in Lewistown, including several custom-built cars. Six weeks of filming on the forty mile track were required to capture all the stunts, helicopter action, gun battles, high falls and special effects sequences. Production photography was completed on August 28, 1995.

John Travolta was originally the choice to portray Riley Hale (finally played by Christian Slater), but was chosen instead to portray Major Vic Deakins.

Release
Broken Arrow was No. 1 at the North American box office on its opening weekend grossing $15.6 million. It stayed on top for a second week and ultimately had a domestic gross of $70,770,147 and an international gross of $79,500,000, for a total worldwide gross of $150,270,147.

Reception
Based on 35 reviews collected by the film review aggregator Rotten Tomatoes, 54% of critics gave Broken Arrow a positive review (19 "Fresh"; 16 "Rotten"), with an average rating of 5.7 out of 10. The site's consensus states: "John Woo adds pyrotechnic glaze to John Travolta's hammy performance, but fans may find Broken Arrow to be a dispiritingly disposable English-language entry for the action auteur." Metacritic, which assigns a normalized rating out of top reviews from mainstream critics, calculated an average score of 61, "generally favorable reviews" based on 21 reviews. Audiences polled by CinemaScore gave the film an average grade of "B+" on an A+ to F scale.

The review of this movie on Siskel & Ebert & the Movies represents the only time that Roger Ebert convinced Gene Siskel to change his mind about his final judgment of a film. Siskel initially gave the film a marginal "thumbs up" but changed it to a "thumbs down" after hearing Ebert's criticisms. Ebert called it "a slow, talky action thriller that plays like a homage to the Fallacy of the Talking Killer." This fallacy "occurs when all the bad guy has to do is pull the trigger, and his problems are over. Instead, he talks, and talks, until his target escapes from his predicament." Ebert queried the "purpose of a digital readout on a bomb. Who will ever see it, except in a mad bomber movie?" and summed up the film saying that it all "comes down to two guys fighting on a burning train for a channel-surfer".

See also

 1996 in film
 Cinema of the United States
 List of American films of 1996

References

External links

 
 
 
 

1996 films
1996 action thriller films
1990s spy films
American action thriller films
American aviation films
American spy films
Films about nuclear war and weapons
Films shot in Montana
Films set in Utah
Films directed by John Woo
Neo-Western films
20th Century Fox films
Rail transport films
Films scored by Hans Zimmer
Films about the United States Air Force
1990s chase films
Films about terrorism in the United States
1990s English-language films
1990s American films